The iKon Awards - Film & Television is an awarding programme founded by Humphrey Nabimanya that recognizes and rewards implementers and personalities in the Film and Television and Mainstream Media in Uganda and ultimately, Afrika.
Formally The iKon awards is an initiative, The new annual initiative is now presented by SAUTIplus Media Hub.

The awards seek to award (recognize and reward formidable implementers including filmmakers and actors), connect (link participants and their interventions/films/show/series to opportunities for resource mobilisation, networking, core organisational development, and publicity) and educate (through one-on-one sessions, webinars, online courses and summits from professionals in the film industry).

Background 
The 1st Ikon Awards ceremony, presented by the Sauti Plus Hub, will honor Ugandan films released from 2021 and 2022, and is scheduled to take place at the Kampala Serena Hotel in Kampala, Uganda, on March 25, 2023. 

Film producer Usama Mukwaya was named as producer of the first edition which marks his first "live" television production credit for a major show.

The nominations were announced by actors Laura Kahunde and Sam Bagenda on January 28, 2023 live on NBS TV./

The following are the categories for the iKon awards unveiled during its launch at the Kampala Serena Hotel

Awards

Young Filmmakers Fellowship Program 
The opportunity is designed to target young, passionate, enthusiastic and emerging filmmakers interested in filmmaking and the film industry.
Ten young filmmakers will be supported with a $500 grant each to produce a 5- to 10-minute short films and also provided with mentorship from experienced filmmakers.

References

External links 
 Ikon Awards Website
 Humphrey Nabimanya

Ugandan film awards
Awards established in 2022
Ugandan television awards